Monoacylglycerol lipase (EC 3.1.1.23; systematic name glycerol-ester acylhydrolase, also known as MAG lipase, acylglycerol lipase, MAGL, MGL or MGLL) is an enzyme that, in humans, is encoded by the MGLL gene. MAGL is a 33-kDa, membrane-associated member of the serine hydrolase superfamily and contains the classical GXSXG consensus sequence common to most serine hydrolases. The catalytic triad has been identified as Ser122, His269, and Asp239.

Function 

Monoacylglycerol lipase catalyzes a reaction that uses water molecules to break the glycerol monoesters of long-chain fatty acids:

 hydrolyses glycerol monoesters of long-chain fatty acids

It functions together with hormone-sensitive lipase (LIPE) to hydrolyze intracellular triglyceride stores in adipocytes and other cells to fatty acids and glycerol. MGLL may also complement lipoprotein lipase (LPL) in completing hydrolysis of monoglycerides resulting from degradation of lipoprotein triglycerides.

Monoacylglycerol lipase is a key enzyme in the hydrolysis of the endocannabinoid 2-arachidonoylglycerol (2-AG).  It converts monoacylglycerols to the free fatty acid and glycerol. The contribution of MAGL to total brain 2-AG hydrolysis activity has been estimated to be ~85% (ABHD6 and ABHD12 are responsible for ~4% and ~9%, respectively, of the remainder), and this in vitro estimate has been confirmed in vivo by the selective MAGL inhibitor JZL184. Chronic inactivation of MAGL results in massive (>10-fold) elevations of brain 2-AG in mice, along with marked compensatory downregulation of CB1 receptors in selective brain areas.

Inhibitors 
MAGL enzyme inhibitors (URB602, URB754, JZL184) produce cannabinoid behavioral effects in mice.

Further examples include:
KML-29
JZL195
JNJ-42165279
JW 642

See also 
 Endocannabinoid enhancer
 Endocannabinoid reuptake inhibitor
 Triacylglycerol lipase
 Fatty acid amide hydrolase

References

External links 
 
 
 Monoglyceride lipase (MGLL) Human Protein Atlas 

EC 3.1.1
Enzymes of unknown structure